Supergirl is the name of seven comic book series published by DC Comics, featuring various characters of the same name. The majority of the titles feature Superman's cousin Kara Zor-El.

Publication history

Volume 1 (1972-1974)
The first series featured the original Supergirl, Superman's cousin Kara Zor-El. It began publication in 1972 following a 44-issue run of Supergirl stories in Adventure Comics, ending with issue #424 (October 1972). The series lasted for 10 issues until 1974, after which the character began appearing regularly in The Superman Family commencing with issue #165. The release of the last issue of Supergirl was delayed for several months due to a nationwide paper shortage.

Volume 2 (1982-1984)
During its first year of publication, the second Kara Zor-El series was titled The Daring New Adventures of Supergirl. With issue #13, the name was shortened to Supergirl, and the title continued monthly publication for a total of 23 issues.

Volume 3 (1994)
In 1994, DC Comics published a four-issue limited series featuring a new Supergirl who was introduced early in the Post-Crisis era.  Sometimes referred to as the Matrix, this new character was a protoplasmic duplicate of an alternate universe Lana Lang, granted superpowers by an alternate Lex Luthor.  Having been brought to the mainstream DC Universe by Superman, she became romantically involved with the mainstream Luthor, who was posing as his own fictitious son Lex Luthor II.  This limited series resolved many of the threads remaining from that storyline.

Volume 4 (1996-2003)
The fourth series featured a third Supergirl. This character was a fusion of the Matrix Supergirl and Linda Danvers (a Post-Crisis version of Linda Lee Danvers, Kara Zor-El's Pre-Crisis secret identity). The series ran for 80 issues, ending with the main character journeying to an alternate universe following the re-emergence of the original version of Kara Zor-El.

Volume 5 (2005-2011)
In 2004, DC Comics introduced an updated version of Kara Zor-El in the pages of Superman/Batman.  The following year, she began appearing in her own ongoing series, with Superman/Batman #19 being republished as issue #0 of Supergirl. Sterling Gates took over the title in late 2008 with issue #34. Amy Reeder Hadley was announced as the new cover artist for the series in May 2010.

Supergirl: Cosmic Adventures in the Eighth Grade (2008-2009)
It is a 6-part mini-series featuring the Linda Lee version of Supergirl, written by Landry Walker.

Volume 6 (2011–2015)
DC Comics relaunched Supergirl with issue #1 in September 2011 as part of The New 52 reboot.

Supergirl: Being Super (2016-2017)
The four-part miniseries Supergirl: Being Super, written by Mariko Tamaki and pencilled by Joelle Jones, is a coming-of-age take on Supergirl's origins.  It depicts Kara as a seemingly ordinary teenager living in the rural Midvale with the Danvers, since the couple found her inside a pod in the middle of a field. Kara grows up aware of the pod and her unknown origins (which are glimpsed in dreams) and struggles to live a normal life as she discovers her astonishing super-human abilities, which she keeps a secret even from her closest friends.

Volume 7 (2016–2020)
A new Supergirl series written by Steve Orlando and incorporating elements of the Supergirl television series began in September 2016 (November 2016 cover date) as part of the DC Rebirth relaunch. The series took a three-month hiatus in April 2018 and resumed publication in August 2018 with the release of #21. The new creative team was writer Marc Andreyko and artist Kevin Maguire.

Starting with issue #37 in December 2019, writer Jody Houser and artist Rachael Stott helmed the series until cancellation in June 2020; issue #42 was the last in the volume. The final arc dealt with the fallout from Batman/Superman's "The Infected" event where Supergirl was "infected by a tainted Batarang that was meant for Superman"; as a result, Supergirl turned "into something of an unstoppable villain".

Supergirl: Woman of Tomorrow (2021–2022) 
Supergirl: Woman of Tomorrow is an eight-issue miniseries by writer Tom King and artist Bilquis Evely which started in June 2021. It focuses on Kara Zor-El's quest in space and is told from the perspective of Ruthye, a new character. Ruthye, an alien girl Kara meets, is looking for justice for her father's death. The last issue in the series was released in February 2022. Susana Polo, for Polygon, commented that "with the final issue of Supergirl: Woman of Tomorrow I can definitively say this book slaps front to back, applying Sandman vibes to space adventure starring Supergirl and a plucky young space child. The best thing Tom King’s done since Mister Miracle and Bilquis Evely just dropping mics on every dang page". Supergirl: Woman of Tomorrow was nominated for the 2022 "Best Limited Series" Eisner Award.

References

External links
DC page: SG2005, SG2016, SGCAITEG2009, SBS2016, SGWOT2021

1972 comics debuts
1982 comics debuts
1983 comics debuts
1994 comics debuts
1998 comics debuts
2005 comics debuts
2011 comics debuts
2016 comics debuts
Comics about women
Comics by Arnold Drake
Comics by Greg Rucka
Comics by Jeph Loeb
Comics by Joe Kelly (comics writer)
Comics by Marc Andreyko
Comics by Paul Kupperberg
Comics by Peter David
Comics spin-offs
Female characters in comics
GLAAD Media Award for Outstanding Comic Book winners
Supergirl